SVA Papendorp (Magreb '90 until 2018) are a Dutch amateur  football club from Utrecht, founded in 1990. The club holds a Saturday team competing in the Derde Divisie, the fourth tier of professional football in the Netherlands.

History
The club was founded on 26 November 1990 in the Leidsche Rijn neighborhood of Utrecht. The home matches are played on Sportpark Papendorp, in the Industry park of the same name. The standard Sunday team were promoted to the Topklasse ahead of the 2015–16 season, having won the Hoofdklasse A the previous season. The 2010–11 season marked the last time the Saturday team played in the standard competition, competing in the Vijfde Klasse (West-1, 5C). Since the 2017–18 season the Saturday team (former Sunday team) compete in the Derde Divisie (fourth tier) of Dutch national football.

In 2018 the first squadwas ejected from the Hoofdklasse after continuing problems staging a proper team. In October 2019 a referee and a game official in a game of the second squad were threatened, leading to the cancellation of Papendorp's KNVB participation. In an appeal, the court decided that the KNVB's decision was reasonable.

Results

Sunday team

Honours
 Hoofdklasse A (Sunday clubs)
2014–15

References

Football clubs in the Netherlands
Moroccan diaspora in Europe
Football clubs in Utrecht (city)
Association football clubs established in 1990
1990 establishments in the Netherlands
Diaspora sports clubs